Eric Frenzel (born 21 November 1988) is a German nordic combined skier who has been competing since 2000.

Career
One of the most successful nordic combined athletes of all time. He won the Olympic gold medals in the 10km individual normal hill at the 2014 Winter Olympics and 10km individual normal hill at the 2018 Winter Olympics. He won a bronze medal in the 4 x 5 km team event at the 2010 Winter Olympics in Vancouver, a silver medal in the 4 x 5 km team event at the 2014 Winter Olympics in Sochi and the gold medal in the 4 x 5 km team event at the 2018 Winter Olympics in Pyeongchang.

Frenzel won a silver medal in the 4 x 5 km team event at the FIS Nordic World Ski Championships 2009 in Liberec and earned his best individual finish of eighth in the 10 km mass start at those same championships. Later he won three individual gold medals and four team gold medals in the next editions of FIS Nordic World Ski Championships.

Record

Olympic Games

World Championship

World Cup

Standings

Individual victories

External links

1988 births
Living people
People from Annaberg-Buchholz
German male Nordic combined skiers
Nordic combined skiers at the 2010 Winter Olympics
Nordic combined skiers at the 2014 Winter Olympics
Nordic combined skiers at the 2018 Winter Olympics
Nordic combined skiers at the 2022 Winter Olympics
Olympic Nordic combined skiers of Germany
Olympic gold medalists for Germany
Olympic silver medalists for Germany
Olympic bronze medalists for Germany
Olympic medalists in Nordic combined
FIS Nordic World Ski Championships medalists in Nordic combined
Medalists at the 2010 Winter Olympics
Medalists at the 2014 Winter Olympics
Medalists at the 2018 Winter Olympics
Medalists at the 2022 Winter Olympics
Holmenkollen medalists
Sportspeople from Saxony